Jean-Luc Sadourny (born 26 August 1966 in Toulouse) is a former French rugby union footballer and a current coach. He played as a fullback. He was nicknamed The Old Woman (La Vieille) and he is generally considered one of the best French players of his generation, a fair successor to Serge Blanco in his position.

Sadourny played all his career at US Colomiers, which is based in Colomiers, a suburb of Toulouse. His best result was the 2nd place in the France Top 14 in 2000.

He had 71 caps for France, from 1991 to 2001. He scored 15 tries and 4 drop goals, in an aggregate of 86 points, during his international career. The French fullback was selected for the 1991 Rugby World Cup, playing a single match, and for the 1995 Rugby World Cup, playing in all the five matches. He helped France to reach the 3rd place in this event. He won the Five Nations twice, with grand slams, in 1997 and 1998. Sadourny is also remembered for scoring the famous "try from the end of the world" against the All Blacks in 1994. In the second and final Test of France's tour of New Zealand, France were trailing with about 3 minutes to play and were pinned deep in their own end by a tactical kick. They counter-attacked down the field, with the ball touched by nine different French players before Sadourny touched down to give Les Bleus the points that secured a 23-20 win and a 2–0 series win.

After retiring as a player, Sadourny entered the coaching ranks at Colomiers. He left to take over the reins at Blagnac for the 2007–08 season, leading them to an appearance in the Fédérale 1 final, where they lost to his former club Colomiers. As is standard practice in France, both finalists earned promotion to Rugby Pro D2 for the 2008–09 season. However, Sadourny chose not to stay with Blagnac, moving to Fédérale 3 club Stade Saint-Gaudinois for 2008–09, where he currently remains.

In 2010, Sadourny opened his own restaurant, the Sadourny Café, in Colomiers.

External links
Jean-Luc Sadourny International Matches

1966 births
Living people
US Colomiers players
French rugby union players
French rugby union coaches
Rugby union fullbacks
France international rugby union players
Rugby union players from Toulouse